Pedro Font (1737–1781) was a Franciscan missionary and diarist.

Biography 

He was born in 1737 in Girona, Catalonia, Spain.  Font received his training at Querétaro Missionary College.  From 1773 to 1775, he served at Mission San José de Tumacácori in Pima Country.  He was the chaplain of Juan Bautista de Anza's expedition that explored Alta California from 1775 to 1776.  Font authored the diary With Anza to California, the principal account of the expedition.  While a member of the expedition, Font created one of the first maps of San Francisco Bay in early 1776.  He also identified the site for the proposed Mission San Francisco de Asís, which would be established later that year by Fathers Junípero Serra and Francisco Palóu.  Font was also involved in the excommunication of then-military governor Fernando Rivera y Moncada, whose use of force on a neophyte is described in detail in With Anza to California.  Font later served at Mission Santa Teresa de Atil, Mission Santa Maria Magdalena, Mission San Pedro y San Pablo del Tubutama and La Purísima Concepción de Caborca prior to his death at the visita of San Diego del Pitiquito in 1781.

In 1777, Pedro Font's map named the mountain range currently known as the Sierra Nevada. Font described the California grizzly bear, writing, "He was horrible, fierce, large, and fat." Font interacted with Native Americans and observed homosexual behavior and saw a great need for Christianity to eradicate these "nefarious practices."

Legacy 
Font Street, in San Francisco's Parkmerced neighborhood is named for him. It intersects Arballo Drive ironically, as Arballo Drive is named for Senora Maria Feliciana Arballo, whom Font did not like. "Two centuries ago Font got in a huff over the actions of the young widow Senora Arballo, who, after a particularly difficult day of the journey, entertained the travelers and herself with 'the scandal of the fandango which lasted very late,' wrote Font. That wasn't all, he wrote indignantly "She sang some verses which were not at all nice."

References

18th-century diarists
Franciscan missionaries
Spanish Friars Minor
18th-century Spanish Roman Catholic priests
Roman Catholic missionaries in New Spain
People in colonial Arizona
1737 births
1781 deaths